Mar Cambrollé Jurado (born 1957) is a Spanish trans rights activist.

Early life 
Mar Cambrollé Jurado was born in Seville in 1957. Her father hit her when she was a child because she was feminine. She dropped out of school at age 13, and began working as a dishwasher at age 14.

Cambrollé sold crafts in Seville for 14 years, but did not make enough money to set up a storefront. She worked as a prostitute in Barcelona and Italy for a few months, then returned to Seville and used the money she had earned to buy furniture for her house and set up a store.

Activity 
Under the Franco regime, Cambrollé organized the first gay liberation campaign in Andalusia.

The hunger strike lasted eleven hours before Unidas Podemos agreed to bring the law to a debate in Congress by August 2019. Cambrollé expressed disapproval of the chosen deadline, but said that the hunger strike had been successful.

, Cambrollé was the president of the Asociación de Transexuales de Andalucía. , she was the president of the Federación Plataformas Trans.

Accolades 
In October 2018, the University of Málaga's Faculty of Psychology and Speech Therapy honored Cambrollé for her ongoing trans rights activism beginning in her youth.

References 

Spanish transgender people
Spanish LGBT rights activists
Living people
1957 births
Transgender women
Transgender rights activists